Kahaloo Upazila is an upazila of Bogra District in the Division of Rajshahi, Bangladesh. Kahaloo Thana was established in 1928 and was converted into an upazila in 1983. It is named after its administrative center, the town of Kahaloo.

Geography
It is bounded on the west by the Nagar River (across which lies Dhupchanchia Upazila). It borders Shibganj Upazila to the north, Bogra Sadar and Shajahanpur upazilas to the east, Nandigram Upazila to the southwest, and Adamdighi Upazila to the west.
(J.M)

Demographics

According to the 2011 Bangladesh census, Kahaloo Upazila had 58,261 households and a population of 222,376, 6.2% of whom lived in urban areas. 9.4% of the population was under the age of 5. The literacy rate (age 7 and over) was 52.1%, compared to the national average of 51.8%.
The total number of voters in Kahalu upazila is 1,46,786. Of these, 71,501 are male voters and 85,265 are female voters.

Administration
Kahaloo Upazila is divided into Kahaloo Municipality and nine union parishads: Bir Kedar, Durgapur, Jamgaon, Kahaloo, Kalai Majh Para, Malancha, Murail, Narahatta, and Paikar. The union parishads are subdivided into 161 mauzas and 264 villages.

Kahaloo Municipality is subdivided into 9 wards and 19 mahallas.

Transport
Railway stations Panchpir Mazar and Kahaloo are on the branch line connecting Santahar and Kaunia . In July 2014 they were served by six or eight intercity and six mail trains a day.

Education

There are four colleges in the upazila. They include Azizul Haque Memorial Degree College, Dargahat Degree College, and Kahaloo Adarsha Women's Degree College. Kahaloo Degree College is the only honors level college in the upazila.

The madrasa education system here includes five fazil madrasas.

See also
Upazilas of Bangladesh
Districts of Bangladesh
Divisions of Bangladesh

References

Upazilas of Bogra District